Sylvain Patrick Jean N'Diaye (born 25 June 1976) is a French-born Senegalese former professional footballer who played as a defensive midfielder.

Club career
Born in Paris, N'Diaye played for FC Girondins de Bordeaux, who loaned him to FC Martigues, Belgian First Division's KAA Gent, Toulouse FC, Lille OSC and Olympique de Marseille. Whilst at Marseille, he started in the 2004 UEFA Cup Final.

Other than in Belgium, he also had abroad stints with Spain's Levante UD, helping the team achieve top flight promotion in 2006, and CD Tenerife. In July 2008, he returned to France, signing with Ligue 2 outfit Stade de Reims. On 12 July 2010, he signed for AS Cannes.

International career
N'Diaye received 17 international caps for Senegal, and participated at the 2002 World Cup. However, he played no minutes for the quarterfinalists.

References

External links
 
 Olympique Marseille profile 

1976 births
Living people
Footballers from Paris
French sportspeople of Senegalese descent
Senegalese expatriate sportspeople in Spain
Senegalese footballers
French footballers
Senegalese expatriate footballers
Ligue 1 players
FC Girondins de Bordeaux players
FC Martigues players
AS Monaco FC players
Toulouse FC players
Lille OSC players
Olympique de Marseille players
Stade de Reims players
Belgian Pro League players
K.A.A. Gent players
La Liga players
Levante UD footballers
CD Tenerife players
Senegal international footballers
2002 FIFA World Cup players
Association football midfielders
2002 African Cup of Nations players
2004 African Cup of Nations players
Expatriate footballers in Belgium
Expatriate footballers in Spain